José Marcio Ramirez Barreto (born 3 September 1976) is a retired Brazilian football player who appeared with Mohun Bagan AC. 2007–08, Later he played for Calcutta Football League outfit Bhawanipore FC, and captained the team. He also worked as assistant coach of Indian Super League club Atlético de Kolkata in 2019.

Career

Mohun Bagan

Barreto came to India after signing with Mohun Bagan AC in 1999. In June 2006, he switched from Mahindra United back to Mohun Bagan, for an Indian football record transfer fee of 60 lakhs.

He played his last match for Mohun Bagan on 6 May 2012 against Pune FC in last round of I-League match.

Barreto still remains fifth in the list of top goalscorers in NFL/I-League with 101 goals, 94 of those came while playing for Bagan. He is also the all time top goalscorer of Federation Cup with 27 goals.

Honours
Individual
 National Football League Golden Boot: 2000–01 (14 goals)
 Dhiren Dey Award by Mohun Bagan AC: 2001
Federation Cup all time top goalscorer (with 27 goals)

References

Bibliography

External links

1976 births
People from Bagé
Brazilian footballers
Expatriate footballers in Malaysia
Living people
Brazilian people of Spanish descent
Brazilian expatriates in Malaysia
Expatriate footballers in India
Brazilian expatriate sportspeople in India
Mohun Bagan AC players
I-League players
Mahindra United FC players
Penang F.C. players
Association football forwards
Calcutta Football League players
Sportspeople from Rio Grande do Sul